Normandy is a city in St. Louis County, Missouri, United States. The population was 4,287 at the 2020 census.

History

The city of Normandy is on land once owned by Charles Lucas. Lucas obtained property from the federal government with land grants, and he purchased the land from victims of the New Madrid earthquake of 1811. He named it for the French coastal region of Normandy from which his father John Baptiste Charles Lucas came. The site of his home is now on the property of Incarnate Word Academy.

Lucas was to fight two duels on Bloody Island with Thomas Hart Benton, and died in the 1817 duel.

Upon Charles death, and that of his father, Federal Land Grant Judge J.B.C. Lucas, his land was left to his sister Anne and brother James.  Anne married Capt. Theodore Hunt, Son of the Patriot Abraham Hunt of Trenton, N.J., who died in 1832.  In 1836 she married Theodore's 1st cousin, the explorer Wilson Price Hunt.  The Hunt home at 7717 Natural Bridge Rd. was completed in 1908 after the current site of Glen Echo Club (the old Hunt Estate ) was leased to the Golf Club in 1898 and late sold to the club. It was used for several years as the convent of the Sisters of the Cenacle before being taken over by the Normandy School District.

Normandy incorporated in May 1945.

In 1960, the Normandy School District approved a bond issue to buy the Bellerive Country Club to form a junior college. In 1963 the Normandy Residence Center became the University of Missouri–St. Louis; the university is partially within the city of Normandy.

In May 1977, Normandy annexed Berdell Hills.

Geography
Normandy is located at  (38.715551, -90.300284).

Demographics

2020 census
As of the 2020 census, 4,287 people and 2,271 households were living in the city. The racial makeup of the city was 18.2% White, 70.8% African American, 0.3% Native American, 5.7% Asian, 1.2% from other races, and 3.7% from two or more races. Hispanic or Latino of any race were 2.7% of the population.

2010 census
As of the census of 2010, there were 5,008 people, 1,942 households, and 1,023 families living in the city. The racial makeup of the city was 21.3% White, 69.7% African American, 0.3% Native American, 5.6% Asian, 0.9% from other races, and 2.1% from two or more races. Hispanic or Latino of any race were 1.6% of the population.

There were 1,942 households, of which 31.3% had children under the age of 18 living with them, 20.4% were married couples living together, 27.7% had a female householder with no husband present, 4.6% had a male householder with no wife present, and 47.3% were non-families. 33.6% of all households were made up of individuals, and 4.9% had someone living alone who was 65 years of age or older. The average household size was 2.34 and the average family size was 3.06.

The median age in the city was 26 years. 23% of residents were under the age of 18; 24.7% were between the ages of 18 and 24; 22.9% were from 25 to 44; 21.8% were from 45 to 64; and 7.7% were 65 years of age or older. The gender makeup of the city was 45.8% male and 54.2% female.

2000 census
As of the census of 2000, there were 5,153 people, 2,166 households, and 1,163 families living in the city. The racial makeup of the city was 26.82% White, 66.68% African American, 0.25% Native American, 3.18% Asian, 0.06% Pacific Islander, 0.47% from other races, and 2.54% from two or more races. Hispanic or Latino of any race were 1.28% of the population.

There were 2,166 households, out of which 30.4% had children under the age of 18 living with them, 23.9% were married couples living together, 24.7% had a female householder with no husband present, and 46.3% were non-families. 34.4% of all households were made up of individuals, and 5.5% had someone living alone who was 65 years of age or older. The average household size was 2.32 and the average family size was 3.02.

In the city, the population was spread out, with 26.0% under the age of 18, 18.9% from 18 to 24, 29.3% from 25 to 44, 17.6% from 45 to 64, and 8.2% who were 65 years of age or older. The median age was 28 years. For every 100 females, there were 82.3 males. For every 100 females age 18 and over, there were 74.1 males.

The median income for a household in the city was $25,802, and the median income for a family was $31,628. Males had a median income of $29,333 versus $25,634 for females. The per capita income for the city was $14,399. About 17.3% of families and 24.1% of the population were below the poverty line, including 24.1% of those under age 18 and 18.6% of those age 65 or over.

Education

Public Education 
In July 2014, the Missouri State Board of Education established Normandy Schools Collaborative, formerly the Normandy School District. The Collaborative provides pre-Kindergarten and K-12 education for students in Normandy. The area is served by Normandy High School.

Private Education 
Private K-12 schooling is offered at St. Ann Catholic School. St. Ann also operates St. Ann Early Childhood Center.

Higher Education 
The University of Missouri - St. Louis is a public university whose campus is partially located within Normandy.

Libraries 
The St. Louis County Library operates the Natural Bridge Branch in Normandy.

Parks and Recreation 
Normandy's main park is the Robert Hoelzel Memorial Park. Other pocket parks that can be accessed throughout the municipality include:

 Belwood Park
 Hoard's Grove
 Parchester Park
 Tear Drop Park

Police Services
The Normandy Police Department provides police services to the surrounding communities of Cool Valley, Greendale, Bellerive, Glen Echo Park, Pasadena Hills and Pasadena Park.

Public Transportation

MetroLink 
MetroLink services are available in Normandy at the UMSL South Station.

Community and Economic Development

Great Streets Projects 
In 2014 Normandy approved a Great Streets initiative to redevelop the stretch of Natural Bridge Road between North Hanley and Lucas and Hunt Roads. Construction began in June of that year and was completed in May 2016. Other street revitalization projects in Normandy apart of this initiative included improving the Teardrop and Belwood parks.

Notable people 

 Jon Hamm, actor

References

Cities in St. Louis County, Missouri
Cities in Missouri